Afrin may refer to:

Places
 Afrin Canton, one of the cantons of the de facto autonomous Democratic Federation of Northern Syria
 Afrin District, a district of Aleppo Governorate in northern Syria. The administrative centre is the city of Afrin
 Afrin Subdistrict, a subdistrict of the Afrin District
 Afrin Region, the westernmost of the three regions of the de facto autonomous Democratic Federation of Northern Syria
 Afrin River, a river in Turkey and Syria
 Afrin Dam, dam on the Afrin River in northwest Syria
 Afrin, Syria, a city in northwestern Syria, administratively part of Aleppo Governorate

Institutions
 Afrin SC, a football club based in Afrin, Syria
 University of Afrin, an unrecognized university established in the city of Afrin by the Afrin Canton Board of Education

Products
 Afrin (nasal spray), a nasal decongestant

People

Given name
 Afrin Ali (born 1986), Indian politician

Surname
 Jill Afrin (born 1962), psychiatrist
 Nahid Afrin (born 2001), Indian playback singer
 Narin Afrin, resistance leader